Telmatophilus americanus is a species of silken fungus beetle in the family Cryptophagidae.

References

Further reading

 

Cryptophagidae
Articles created by Qbugbot
Beetles described in 1863